"Walk Thru" is a song by American hip hop recording artist Rich Homie Quan. The song was released on February 4, 2014, as the lead single from his second official mixtape I Promise I Will Never Stop Going In. "Walk Thru" was produced by Dupri of League of Starz and Problem, the latter which also makes a guest appearance. The music video was filmed on May 6, 2014, where Quan suffered from two seizures due to heat exhaustion. The song has since peaked at number 74 on the US Billboard Hot 100 chart.

Background 
"Walk Thru" was originally premiered on November 26, 2013, as a track on Rich Homie Quan's second official mixtape I Promise I Will Never Stop Going In. The song was produced by Dupri from production team League of Starz and Problem, who is also featured on the song. The CD quality version of the song without DJ Drama's tags was released online on January 3, 2014. The song was then released for digital download by T.I.G. Entertainment on February 4, 2014.

The song features Rich Homie Quan crafting a "catchy melody over the instrumental's thudding bass and yawning synths." Problem's appearance adds a West Coast hip hop spin to the incontestable Southern song.

Critical reception 
Jimi of The Source said, "Both emcees mesh their different styles of sing-rapping perfectly, almost harmonizing at points. They trade verse back and forth, eventually gliding into their addictive hook that Quan sings. The Atlien brings his unorthodox flow and vocal delivery to share with listeners his struggle and hustle. It is an interesting fusion to say the least".

Music video 
The music video for "Walk Thru" was filmed on May 6, 2014 with Problem in Atlanta's Piedmont Park. Shockingly, during the filming Rich Homie Quan experienced heat exhaustion which led to Quan suffering two seizures and a fall that resulted in a head injury. Filming for the music video would later also take place in Problem's hometown Compton, California. The Gabriel Hart-directed video would then be released on July 27, 2014.

Track listing

Chart performance

Weekly charts

Year-end charts

Release history

References

External links

2014 singles
2013 songs
Rich Homie Quan songs
Electro songs
Music videos directed by Gabriel Hart
Songs written by Problem (rapper)